Regionale Verkehrsbetriebe Baden-Wettingen is the main operator of bus services to the District of Baden in the Canton of Aargau, Switzerland.

Bus Operations
The company operates 63 buses, on 12 commercial routes, in the area.

It also operates a network of night bus services, branded as Nachtwelle.

Routes

Rolling stock

 21 Lion's City G
 10 Lion's City GL
 7 Lion's City
 4 Lion's City M
 1 Lions City Hybrid
 8 Hess-Scania Low-Entry 12m
 6 Hess-Scania Low Entry 18m
 2 Sprinter City 35
 2 Sprinter City 65

References

External links
 Official site

Bus companies of Switzerland
Transport in Switzerland
Public transport in Switzerland